Marie von Olfers (27 October 1826, Berlin – 8 January 1924, Berlin) was a German writer, illustrator and salonnière. She wrote under the pseudonym M(aria) Werner, Werner Maria. She was also a major artistic influence on her niece Sibylle von Olfers.

Life
She was the second daughter of the museum director Ignaz von Olfers and the writer Hedwig, née von Staegemann.

Works 

 Drei Märchen. Zum Besten einer armen Waise (1862)
 Herr Mops. Ein Mährchen (1863)
 Frau Evchen. Eine sehr alltägliche Historie (1865)
 Novellen (1872)
 Eigenthum (Novelle, in: Deutsche Rundschau, 1. Jg. Bd. 2, 1875)
 Neue Novellen (1876)
 Nathanael (1880)
 Zeichen- und Mal-Fibel (1882)
 Der Sohn des Herzens (1882)
 Vielliebchen. Ein Blumenmärchen (1882)
 Ragenhart und Swanhild. Ein Harzepos aus dem achten Jahrhundert in 12 Gesängen (1883)
 Simplizitas (Episches Gedicht, 1884)
 Die Vernunftheirath und andere Novellen (1887)
 Backfische und Alte Jungfern (Novellen, 1897)
 Zwei Novellen. Jeremias und die schöne Vincenzia, Frau Evchen (1907)
 Maximiliane Gräfin von Oriola, geb. von Arnim. Eine Jugenderinnerung (in: Illustrierte Frauen-Zeitung, 22. Jg., Heft 4)
 Briefe und Tagebücher, hrsg. v. Margarete von Olfers (1928–1930)
 Band 1: 1826–1870
 Band 2: 1870–1924
 Rosenwölkchen  (Roskow, 9 September)

Bibliography 
 Heinrich Groß: Deutsche Dichterinen und Schriftstellerinen in Wort & Bild: Fr. Thiel, Berlin 1885, S. 258ff.
 Petra Wilhelmy-Dollinger: Die Berliner Salons: Mit historisch-literarischen Spaziergängen. Walter de Gruyter, Berlin 2000, .

External links 

 
 Grave of Marie von Olfers
 Manuscripts and letters by Marie von Olfers in libraries and archives

References 

German women novelists
German illustrators
German salon-holders
Writers from Berlin
1826 births
1924 deaths
19th-century German writers
20th-century German writers
19th-century German women writers
20th-century German women writers
20th-century German women